The Castilian languages are Castilian (Spanish) and its closest relatives. Besides derivatives of Spanish such as Judaeo-Spanish and Amazonic Spanish, this refers principally to Extremaduran, a partially mutually intelligible language that is often considered merely a peculiar dialect by other speakers of Spanish.

Name
Ethnologue uses the category "Castilian languages" while Glottolog uses "Castilic".

Notes

References

West Iberian languages